Maulana Abul Kalam Azad University of Technology (MAKAUT), formerly known as West Bengal University of Technology (WBUT), is a public state university located in Kalyani, West Bengal, India. It is funded completely by the Government of West Bengal. It was established in 2001 by the West Bengal legislature. The university provides management and engineering degrees through affiliated colleges and in-house departments.

History
An expert committee was set up on 31 December 1998 by the Government of West Bengal, under the Chairmanship of Ashesh Prosad Mitra, for establishing a university of engineering and technology in West Bengal. The university was formalized on 15 January 2001 by an act of the West Bengal Legislature. The university changed its name from West Bengal University of Technology to Maulana Abul Kalam Azad University of Technology in April 2015.

Campus
 
The university has a main campus covering approximately 40 acres at Haringhata, provided by the Government of West Bengal. Hostels accommodate both male and female students. The university is located in between Bidhan Chandra Krishi Viswavidyalaya and IISER Kolkata.

Departments

The university has 25 departments and centers in seven schools:

Affiliated colleges
Maulana Abul Kalam Azad University of Technology is an affiliating institution and has jurisdiction over the entire state of West Bengal. , it had 198 affiliated colleges.

Academics

Rankings

The National Institutional Ranking Framework (NIRF) ranked it 157 among engineering colleges in 2020.

Accreditation
The university is recognized by the University Grants Commission (UGC). It has been awarded B++ with a CGPA of 2.87 by the NAAC.

See also
List of universities in West Bengal
List of educational institutions in West Bengal
Distance Education Council
University Grants Commission (India)

References

External links

 
Universities and colleges in North 24 Parganas district
Universities in Kolkata
Educational institutions established in 2001
2001 establishments in West Bengal